Ebbe Rode (10 May 1910 – 23 May 1998) was a Danish stage and film actor. His father was the writer/critic Helge Rode and his mother the writer Edith Rode. Ebbe Rode was married to actress Helle Virkner.

Partial filmography

Tango (1933) - Jazzdirigent Jossy Lindtner
Provinsen kalder (1935) - Hans
Millionærdrengen (1936) - Ralph
Den kloge mand (1937) - Ulf Yhomsen
Balletten danser (1938) - Jørgen Frandsen
Afsporet (1942) - Janus Jensen
Søren Søndervold (1942) - Søren Søndervold
Frøken Vildkat (1942) - Peter Bruun
Lykken kommer (1942) - Ole Hagen
Som du vil ha' mig (1943) - Dr. Frederik Holm
Spurve under taget (1944) - Carl
Frihed, lighed og Louise (1944) - Walther Henningsen
Familien Gelinde (1944) - Harry Gelinde
Otte akkorder (1944) - Manfred Thomsen
To som elsker hinanden (1944) - Torben Holm
Den usynlige hær (1945) - Jørgen
Jeg elsker en anden (1946) - John Eriksen
Ditte Menneskebarn (1946) - Johannes - Lars Peters bror
 The Swedenhielm Family (1947) - Rolf Swedenhielm jr.
Ta', hvad du vil ha' (1947) - Kurt Bergholtz
Kristinus Bergman (1948) - Kristinus Bergman
Mikkel (1949) - Speaker (voice)
John og Irene (1949) - John
For frihed og ret (1949) - Rasmus Nielsen
Din fortid er glemt (1950) - Robert
Nålen (1951) - Direktør
Fireogtyve timer (1951) - Dommer Paul Berger
Det kunne vært deg (1952) - Cornelius
Vi som går stjernevejen (1956) - Magister Winther
Jeg elsker dig (1957) - August
Harry og kammertjeneren (1961) - Fabricius
Det stod i avisen (1962) - Poul
Gertrud (1964) - Gabriel Lidman
Naboerne (1966) - Tandlæge Gormsen
Utro (1966) - Torben
Tre mand frem for en trold (1967) - Professor
Oktoberdage (1970) - Leo Stein
Hærværk (1977) - Redaktør Iversen
Rend mig i traditionerne (1979) - Lektor Jacobsen
De uanstændige (1983) - Conrad / Mick and Topsy's father
Sidste akt (1987) - Mr. Osborne
Babettes gæstebud (1987) - Christopher
Høfeber (1991) - Landsretspræsident

External links
 
 Ebbe Rode at Danskefilm.dk 

1910 births
1998 deaths
Danish male film actors
Danish male stage actors
People from Frederiksberg
20th-century Danish male actors